The Basketball Champions League Final Four MVP award is presented to the basketball player who has exhibited the most exceptional play during the Basketball Champions League Final Four.

The award is given out by FIBA, and it began with the Basketball Champions League's inaugural 2016–17 season.

Winners

References

External links
Basketball Champions League (official website)
FIBA (official website)

Basketball Champions League awards and honors
Basketball most valuable player awards